Euphoniinae is a subfamily of finches endemic to the Neotropics.  It contains two genera, Euphonia and Chlorophonia.

The two genera were at one time included in the tanager family Thraupidae. In a large phylogenetic study of the finch family using mitochondrial and nuclear DNA sequences published in 2012, Zuccon and colleagues found that the only Chlorophonia species included in their analysis, the blue-naped chlorophonia, was nested within the Euphonia. This indicated that the genus Euphonia was paraphyletic. A study with more species would be necessary to resolve the taxonomy of the subfamily.

Species list
SUBFAMILY EUPHONIINAE

References

 
Fringillidae
Bird subfamilies